Patipukur railway station is a Kolkata Suburban Railway station in Patipukur. It serves the local areas of Patipukur in South Dumdum and Belgachia in the city of Kolkata, West Bengal, India. Only a few local trains halt here. The station has only a single platform. Its station code is PTKR.

The Station

Complex 
The platform is not very well sheltered. The station lacks many facilities including water and sanitation. It is well connected to the Jessore Road. There is no proper approach road to this station.

Layout

Connection

Auto

Bus 
Bus route number 3C/1, 3C/2, 30C, 30D, 47B, 79B, 91, 91A, 93, 211A, 215/1, 219, 227, DN18, KB16, S160 (Mini), AC40, D11, D23 serve the station.

Metro 
Belgachia metro station is the nearest metro station.

Air 
Netaji Subhas Chandra Bose International Airport is connected via Jessore Rd; distance between Patipukur and the airport is 6.8 km.

External links

References 

Sealdah railway division
Railway stations in Kolkata
Transport in Kolkata
Kolkata Suburban Railway stations
Kolkata Circular Railway